Pitch is a 1997 Canadian documentary created by Kenny Hotz and Spencer Rice, featuring themselves as two young filmmakers attending the Toronto International Film Festival to pitch a film concept to various celebrities.

Their film idea, titled "The Dawn", concerns a Mafia don who goes for a hernia operation but gets a sex change instead. During the 1996 Toronto fest, they approach Roger Ebert, Norman Jewison (at a packed press conference), Eric Stoltz (leaving a limo), Al Pacino, and others without much success. On a roll, they leave Toronto for Hollywood, getting advice from Arthur Hiller and Neil Simon and finding an agent who expresses interest in their pitch. The film was shown at the 1997 Toronto Film Festival.

The film features songs by the Toronto band Phono-Comb.

Trivia
In the Kenny vs. Spenny DVD commentary of the episode "Who Can Stay Handcuffed the Longest?", Spenny revealed that the film did not make the money they expected it to make. During the episode, Kenny flew in an old friend of Spenny's named David Wolfish who Spenny owed money to. Wolfish was one of the investors in the film, investing $10,000 but seeing no return.

External links
 
 Pitch on Kenny Hotz's official YouTube channel
 Official website of film on producer's website
 The shorter, TV version of Pitch on Kenny Hotz's Official channel

Documentary films about the film industry
Canadian documentary films
Toronto International Film Festival
Films about screenwriters
Films shot in Toronto
1997 films
1997 documentary films
1990s English-language films
1990s Canadian films
English-language Canadian films
English-language documentary films